George Gerdes (February 23, 1948 – January 1, 2021) was an American singer-songwriter and character actor.

Early life and education 
He was born in Queens, New York City. He formed a group, the Alumicron Fab Tabs, with friend Loudon Wainwright III, before graduating from Carnegie Mellon University in 1969.

Career 
In the early 1970s, he recorded two albums, Obituary and Son of Obituary, for United Artists Records. His songs were praised by Joni Mitchell and Terre Roche, among others. His second album was produced by Nik Venet and featured session musicians including Charlie McCoy and Kenny Buttrey.

To supplement his income from performing, he started taking acting jobs in the 1980s. He appeared in Sam Shepard's play Fool for Love, and Aaron Sorkin's A Few Good Men, both on Broadway. He also appeared in many television and film roles, including parts in The Squeeze (1987), Miami Vice (1987), Single White Female (1992), Amistad (1997), Hidalgo (2004) and The Girl With the Dragon Tattoo (2011).

Personal life 
Gerdes died from a brain aneurysm in Glendale, California, on January 1, 2021, at the age of 72.

Filmography

Film

Television

References

External links
 
 

1948 births
2021 deaths
American singer-songwriters
American actors